The 1988–89 Divizia A was the seventy-first season of Divizia A, the top-level football league of Romania.

Teams

League table

Positions by round

Results

Top goalscorers

Champion squad

See also 

 1988–89 Divizia B

References

Liga I seasons
Romania
1988–89 in Romanian football